The Middle Dnieper Hydroelectric Station is a run-of-river power plant on the Dnieper River in Kamianske, Ukraine, operated by Ukrhydroenergo. 

The primary purpose of the dam is hydroelectric power generation and navigation. It is the fourth dam in the Dnieper cascade. The dam has an associated lock and a power station with an installed capacity of 352 MW. Construction on the dam began in 1956 and the last generator was commissioned in 1964. Until 2016 the plant was named Dniprodzerzhynska HES, after the Soviet name of the town of Kamianske.

See also 
 Hydroelectricity in Ukraine

References

External links

Dams completed in 1963
Energy infrastructure completed in 1963
Energy infrastructure completed in 1964
Dams in Ukraine
Dams on the Dnieper
Hydroelectric power stations in Ukraine
Run-of-the-river power stations
Hydroelectric power stations built in the Soviet Union
Kamianske